The Bilen language (ብሊና b(ɨ)lina or ብሊን b(ɨ)lin) is spoken by the Bilen people in and around the city of Keren in Eritrea . It is the only Agaw (Central Cushitic) language spoken in Eritrea. It is spoken by about 120,000 people.

Spelling of the name
"Blin" is the English spelling preferred by native speakers, but Bilin and Bilen are also commonly used. Bilin is the reference name arbitrarily used in the current initial English editions of ISO 639-3, but  Blin is also listed as an equivalent name without preference. In the English list of ISO 639-2, Blin is listed in first position in both English and French lists, when Bilin is listed as an alternate name in the English list, and Bilen is the alternate name in the French list. The Ethnologue report lists Bilen as the preferred name, but also Bogo, Bogos, Bilayn, Bilin, Balen, Beleni, Belen, Bilein, Bileno, North Agaw as alternative names.

Phonology
It is not clear if Bilen has tone. It may have pitch accent (Fallon 2004) as prominent syllables always have a high tone, but not all words have such a syllable.

Vowels

Consonants

/r/ is typically realised as a tap when it is medial and a trill when it is in final position.

Fallon (2001, 2004) notes intervocalic lenition, such as  → ; syncope, as in the name of the language,  → ; debuccalization with secondary articulation preserved, as in  →  'mud for bricks'. Intriguingly, the ejectives have voiced allophones, which according to Fallon (2004) "provides an important empirical precedent" for one of the more criticized aspects of the glottalic theory of Indo-European. For example,

Writing system

Ge'ez abugida

A writing system for Bilen was first developed by missionaries who used the Ge'ez abugida and the first text was published in 1882. Although the Ge'ez script is usually used for Semitic languages, the phonemes of Bilen are very similar (7 vowels, labiovelar and ejective consonants). Some of the additional symbols required to write Bilen with this script are in the "Ethiopic Extended" Unicode range rather than the "Ethiopic" range.

Latin alphabet
In 1985 the Eritrean People's Liberation Front decided to use the Latin script for Bilen and all other non-Semitic languages in Eritrea. This was largely a political decision: the Ge'ez script is associated with Christianity because of its liturgical use. The Latin alphabet is seen as being more neutral and secular. In 1993 the government set up a committee to standardize the Bilen language and the Latin-based orthography. "This overturned a 110-year tradition of writing Blin in Ethiopic script." (Fallon, Bilen Orthography )

As of 1997, the alphabetic order was:

e, u, i, a, é, o, b, c, d, f, g, h, j, k, l, m, n, p, q, r, s, t, v, w, x, y, z, ñ, ñw, th, ch, sh, kh, kw, hw, qw, gw.
Also khw.

Their values are similar to the IPA apart from the following:

See also
Bilen people

References

Consonant Mutation and Reduplication in Blin Singulars and Plurals
Language, Education, and Public Policy in Eritrea

External links
Online Blin language tutorial

Further reading
 David L. Appleyard. 2007. "Bilin Morphology". In Alan S. Kaye (ed.), Morphologies of Asia and Africa. Winona Lake, Indiana: Eisenbrauns (pp. 481–504).
 Paul Fallon. 2001. "Some phonological processes in Bilin". In Simpso (ed.), Proceedings of the 27th annual meeting of the Berkeley Linguistics Society.
 Paul Fallon. 2004. "The best is not good enough". In Akinlabi & Adesola (eds), Proceedings: 4th World Congress of African Linguistics
 F.R. Palmer. 1957. "The Verb in Bilin," Bulletin of the School of Oriental and African Studies 19:131-159.
 F.R. Palmer. 1958. "The Noun in Bilin," Bulletin of the School of Oriental and African Studies 21:376-391.
 F.R. Palmer. 1965. "Bilin 'to be' and 'to have'." African Language Studies 6:101-111.
 Leo Reinisch. 1882. Die Bilin-Sprache in Nordost-Afrika. Sitzungsberichte der phil.-hist. Classe der kaiserlichen Akademie der Wissenschaften, vol. 99; Vienna:  Carl Gerold's Sohn.
 Leo Reinisch. 1883. Texte der Bilin Sprache. Leipzig: Grieben.
 Leo Reinisch. 1884. Wörterbuch der Bilin-Sprache. Vienna: Alfred Hölder.
 A.N. Tucker & M.A. Bryan. 1966. Linguistic Analyses:  The Non-Bantu Languages of North-Eastern Africa. London:  Oxford University Press.

Central Cushitic languages
Languages of Eritrea